Brachytritus hieroglyphicus is a species of beetle in the family Cerambycidae, and the only species in the genus Brachytritus. It was described by Quedenfeldt in 1882.

References

Phrynetini
Beetles described in 1882